Three ships of the Soviet Navy have been named for the Bolshevik leader Mikhail Vasilyevich Frunze.
 Russian battleship Frunze (1911), a  originally named Poltava
 , a 
 , named Frunze until 1992, a  missile cruiser subsequently named Admiral Lazarev

Russian Navy ship names
Soviet Navy ship names